Ormen Lange may refer to:
 Ormen Lange (gas field), natural gas field on the Norwegian continental shelf
 Ormen Lange (longship), one of the most famous of the Viking longships